Edward Thomas Sherman (30 August 1902 – 1 July 1987) was an Australian rules footballer who played with Footscray in the Victorian Football League (VFL).

Ted is the brother of Jack Sherman and Bill Sherman.

Notes

External links 

1902 births
1987 deaths
Australian rules footballers from Victoria (Australia)
Western Bulldogs players
Yarraville Football Club players